Choudhary Virender Singh is an Indian politician. He belongs to the Bharatiya Janata Party. He is a member of the Uttar Pradesh Legislative Council. He has also served as a Cabinet Minister in Uttar Pradesh government. He had represented Kandhla(now delimited) constituency for six terms(1980-85, 1985-89, 1989-1991, 1991-1992, 1996-2002, 2002-2007). He has also served as Chairman of UP Sugarcane Seed Development Corporation. At present, he is serving his second term in Uttar Pradesh Legislative Council.

References 

Living people
Uttar Pradesh politicians
Samajwadi Party politicians from Uttar Pradesh
Members of the Uttar Pradesh Legislative Council
Year of birth missing (living people)